Beitar Illit (officially Betar Illit; "Illit" is pronounced "ee-leet") is a Haredi Jewish-Israeli settlement organized as a city council in the Gush Etzion settlement bloc,  southwest of Jerusalem in the West Bank.

The international community considers Israeli settlements in the West Bank illegal under international law, but the Israeli government disputes this.

Name
Beitar Illit (lit.

History 
According to the ARIJ, Beitar Illit was established in 1985 on land which Israel had confiscated from two nearby Palestinian villages: 3,140 dunams from Husan and 1,166 dunams from Nahalin.

It was established by a small group of young families from the religious Zionist yeshiva of Machon Meir. The first residents settled in 1990. As Beitar Illit began to grow, an influx of Haredi Jewish Bobover families came to predominate, while the original group moved on. The city is now home to many Hasidic groups, including Bobov, Boston, Boyan, Breslov, Karlin-Stolin and Slonim. The city has expanded to three adjacent hills.

Geography 
Beitar Illit lies in the northern Judean Hills at about 700 m above sea level. It is located just west of the intersection of Route 60, the north–south artery which roughly follows the watershed from Nazareth through Jerusalem to Beersheba, and Route 375, which descends west into the Elah Valley to the coastal plain and Tel Aviv area. It takes about 10 minutes to get to Jerusalem; Tel Aviv is around 60 minutes away. Beitar Illit is connected to West Jerusalem by the Tunnels Highway, which passes directly underneath the Arab town of Beit Jala and allows access to Jerusalem without coming within view of Arabs.

Demographics

Numbers

At the end of 2003, the population was 23,000 and in 2006 it was 29,100. According to statistics from the Ministry of the Interior, the population in January 2007 was 35,000, an increase of 20% over one year. A Ministry of Interior report from July 2013 placed the population at 45,710.

With an annual birth rate of 1,800 births, Beitar Illit has the fastest population growth among the West Bank settlements. Approximately 63 percent of the population is under the age of 18, which is the highest percentage of children in any Israeli settlement or city.

Character
The population of Beitar Illit is 100% Haredi. Approximately 50% of the population is Hasidic.

An estimated 10 percent of the population is English-speaking. There are three English-speaking synagogues, two English-speaking kollels (one for retirees), and an English-speaking women's group.

As of 2010, all incoming residents used to be screened by an acceptance committee.

Education 
As the population of Beitar Illit is Haredi, the schools are all Haredi schools. The city has close to 20,000 schoolchildren. Of these, approximately 6,000 are enrolled in the city's 225 preschools and daycare centers. Elementary school-age boys attend the city's 27 Talmud Torahs, and elementary school-age girls attend 18 elementary schools. Secondary education includes 21 yeshivas for boys and 11 high schools and post-high schools for girls. Married adult men study in 75 kollels.

Employment 
A significant number of men work, mostly at home or in Jerusalem. Women are employed by local business process outsourcing companies that accommodate the Haredi lifestyle, such as Greenpoint, Matrix, and CityBook. In 2010, it was reported that 64.3% of working-age men and 45.8% of working-age women in Beitar Illit were unemployed.

Culture 
One hundred and forty synagogues and 15 mikvehs serve the population.

Awards 
Beitar Illit has been awarded the Israel Ministry of Interior's gold prize, recognizing "responsible management and sustainable urban planning", for eight years running. In 2002, it received the Ministry of Interior's prize for water conservation in public gardens, urban public institutions, and urban water administration. The municipal welfare department was awarded a prize and recognized by the national government as an "outstanding department" for its work in preventing teen dropouts.

The city is well known for its landscaping and general cleanliness. There are 94 parks and hundreds of playgrounds in the city. From 2000 to 2013, Beitar Illit earned five out of five stars in the Council for a Beautiful Israel's annual "Beautiful Town in a Beautiful Israel" contest, which recognizes a city's investment in environment, aesthetics, and maintenance of appearance and cleanliness. In 2005 the city won the Council for a Beautiful Israel's "Beauty Flag", which is awarded every five years.

Status under international law 

Like all settlements in the Israeli-occupied territories, Beitar Illit is considered illegal under international law, though Israel disputes this. The international community considers Israeli settlements to violate the Fourth Geneva Convention's prohibition on the transfer of an occupying power's civilian population into occupied territory. The Israeli government disputes that the Fourth Geneva Convention applies to the Palestinian territories as they had not been legally held by a sovereign prior to Israel taking control of them. This view has been rejected by the International Court of Justice and the International Committee of the Red Cross.

Controversies 
At an international conference in Karlsruhe in November 2010, Jawad Hasan claimed that sewage and urban runoff from Beitar Illit have contaminated the local hydrological system. The Palestinian Authority claims that sewage flows into neighboring Palestinian fields and orchards. Farmers from Wadi Fukin have complained that since the establishment of Beitar Illit in 1985, 11 natural wells have gone dry and they have suffered from overflow from the settlement's backed up sewers. The Israeli government has ordered Beitar Illit to address these sewage problems.

In 2010, the Israeli interior ministry announced plans to build 112 new apartments during a visit by U.S. vice-president Joe Biden, leading to widespread news coverage that embarrassed the Israeli government.

Beitar Illit was one of four cities named in a petition to the Israeli High Court in December 2010 alleging a pattern of discrimination against Sephardi girls in the local Haredi schools. A Beitar Illit spokesman denied the charges, stating that the percentage of Sephardi girls in the school matched the percentage of Sephardim in the settlement.

Notable residents 
 Moshe Shimon Horowitz, Bostoner Rav of Beitar Illit
 Sinai Moshkovitz, Shotz–Beitar Rav
 Rivka Ravitz, chief of staff to President of Israel Reuven Rivlin

See also 
 List of Israeli settlements with city status in the West Bank

References

External links 
 
 

Cities in the West Bank
Religious Israeli settlements
Gush Etzion Regional Council
Populated places established in 1985
1984 establishments in the Palestinian territories